Hechinger is a surname. Notable people with the surname include:

Fred Hechinger (born 1999), American actor
Fred M. Hechinger (1920-1995), German-born American newspaper editor 
Mike Hechinger (1890–1967), American baseball player